Yoel Razvozov (born 5 July 1980) is an Israeli judoka and politician who served as a member of the Knesset for Yesh Atid in several spells, and as the Minister of Tourism from 2021 to 2022.

Early life
Born Konstantin Anatolyevich Razvozov in Birobidzhan in the Jewish Autonomous Oblast of the Soviet Union, Razvozov began training in judo at age 6. His family immigrated to Israel when he was 11, in 1991, at the fall of the Soviet Union. He joined the Israeli judo team and became an Israeli judo champion at the age of 16.

Athletic career
In the 2003 World Judo Championships, Razvozov finished seventh. He finish second at the European Championships the following year, and represented Israel at the 2004 Summer Olympics. In the final of the 2005 European Championships, he won a silver medal in the 73 kilogram weight category.

Political career
Razvozov entered politics, becoming a member of Netanya City Council. He also became a member of the Israel Olympics Committee. He joined Yesh Atid, and was placed eighth on its list for the 2013 Knesset elections. He was elected to the Knesset as the party won 19 seats. He was placed ninth on the party's list for the 2015 elections, and was re-elected as the party won 11 seats. Razvozov remained a member of the Knesset until 2021, when he resigned under the Norwegian Law to become the Minister of Tourism, a position he held until December of 2022.

Following the end of his tenure as Minister of Tourism, on 23 January 2023, Razvozov announced his intention to resign from the Knesset and retire from politics.

Athletic achievements

References

External links

 
 
 
 
 

1980 births
Living people
Blue and White (political alliance) politicians
Israeli Jews
Israeli male judoka
Israeli people of Russian-Jewish descent
Israeli sports executives and administrators
Jewish Israeli politicians
Jewish Israeli sportspeople
Judoka at the 2004 Summer Olympics
Members of the 19th Knesset (2013–2015)
Members of the 20th Knesset (2015–2019)
Members of the 21st Knesset (2019)
Members of the 22nd Knesset (2019–2020)
Members of the 23rd Knesset (2020–2021)
Members of the 24th Knesset (2021–2022)
Members of the 25th Knesset (2022–)
Ministers of Tourism of Israel
Olympic judoka of Israel
People from Birobidzhan
People from Kiryat Yam
Soviet emigrants to Israel
Soviet Jews
Yesh Atid politicians